The Great Plains Type 1 Front Drive is an American aircraft engine series, produced by Great Plains Aviation Supply of Bennington, Nebraska for use in homebuilt aircraft. The series are all based upon the Volkswagen air-cooled automotive engine.

Design and development
The engine series are all four-cylinder four-stroke, horizontally-opposed, air-cooled, Volkswagen automotive conversion gasoline engines, with direct-drive. They employ magneto ignition systems and, depending on the model, produce  at 3600 rpm, with a compression ratio of 8.0:1. They use a geared electric starter.

The series includes six models, named for their displacement: 
 producing  for take-off
 producing  for take-off
 producing  for take-off
 producing  for take-off
 producing  for take-off
 producing  for take-off.

Applications

Grosso Aircraft Easy Eagle 1
Monnett Sonerai

Specifications (Type 1 Front Drive 2180)

See also

References

External links

Great Plains aircraft engines
Air-cooled aircraft piston engines
1980s aircraft piston engines